The Working Families Party (WFP) is a left-wing minor political party in the United States, founded in New York in 1998. There are active chapters in California, Colorado, Connecticut, Delaware, the District of Columbia, Georgia, Illinois, Maryland, Nevada, New Jersey, New Mexico, New York, Ohio, Oregon, Pennsylvania, Rhode Island, Texas, West Virginia, and Wisconsin.

The Working Families Party of New York was first organized in 1998 by a coalition of labor unions, community organizations, members of the now-inactive national New Party, and a variety of advocacy groups such as Citizen Action of New York and ACORN: the Association of Community Organizations for Reform Now. The party is primarily concerned with healthcare reform, raising the minimum wage, universal paid sick days, addressing student debt, progressive taxation, public education, and energy and environmental reform. It has usually cross-endorsed progressive Democratic and some Republican candidates through fusion voting but occasionally runs its own candidates.

Ideology
WFP follows the ideals of progressive politics, describing itself as a "grass roots independent political organization". The WFP has been referred to by some as the Tea Party movement of the left.

Electoral strategy
Like other minor parties in the state, the WFP benefits from New York's electoral fusion laws that allow the party to support another party's candidate when they feel it aligns with their platform. This allows sympathetic voters to support a minor party without feeling like they are "wasting" their vote. Usually, the WFP endorses the Democratic Party candidate, but it has occasionally endorsed moderate Republican Party candidates as a strategy for spurring bipartisan action on its policy priorities.

In some cases, the WFP has put forward its own candidates. In the chaotic situation following the 2003 assassination of New York City councilman James E. Davis by political rival Othniel Askew, the slain councilman's brother Geoffrey Davis was chosen to succeed him in the Democratic primary. As it became clear that Geoffrey Davis lacked his late brother's political experience, fellow Democrat Letitia James decided to challenge him in the general election on the WFP ticket and won Brooklyn's 35th City Council district as the first third-party candidate elected there in 30 years. Despite this success, James switched back to the Democratic Party when she ran successfully for re-election in 2008.

Some of the party's endorsed candidates include Connecticut Governor Dan Malloy, U.S. Representative Jesús "Chuy" García, US Senators Chris Murphy (CT) and Jeff Merkley (OR), former New York City Mayor Bill de Blasio, former New York Governor Andrew Cuomo, and New York Attorney General Letitia James.

In 2006, the party began ballot access drives in California, Delaware, Massachusetts, Oregon, and South Carolina.

Edwin Gomes, running in a February 2015 special election for the Connecticut State Senate, became the first candidate in the nation to win a state legislative office running solely as a nominee for the Working Families Party.

In 2015, NY WFP ran 111 of its candidates, winning 71 local offices.

In 2015, the WFP endorsed Bernie Sanders in his campaign for U.S. president, its first national endorsement. In 2016, after Hillary Clinton became the Democratic nominee, the WFP endorsed her for president.

In 2017, Joshua M. Hall, running in an April 2017 special election for the Connecticut House of Representatives, became the second candidate in the nation to win a state legislative office running solely as a nominee for the Working Families Party.

In 2019, the WFP endorsed Elizabeth Warren in her campaign for president of the United States. Warren won the endorsement with 60.91% of the vote, compared with 35.82% for runner-up Bernie Sanders. The WFP received some criticism for not releasing the individual vote tallies between the party leadership and membership base, each of which accounts for 50% of the vote. In the 2016 primary the WFP had endorsed Sanders, one of Warren's opponents in the 2020 primary. After Warren dropped out of the race, the WFP endorsed Sanders.

National presence 
Since 2019, the WFP has recruited major progressive elected officials to deliver a Response to the State of the Union address by the President of the United States, as is customary for the opposition party of the President. The following elected officials delivered a response to the State of the Union, beginning in 2019 with a response to then-President Donald Trump:

2019: Mandela Barnes, 45th Lieutenant Governor of Wisconsin

2020: Ayanna Pressley, U.S. Representative from MA-07

2021: Rashida Tlaib, U.S. Representative from MI-13

2022: Jamaal Bowman, U.S. Representative from NY-16

2023: Delia Ramirez, U.S. Representative from IL-03

Campaigns

1990s
In the 1998 election for governor of New York, the party cross-endorsed the Democratic Party candidate, Peter Vallone. Because he received more than 50,000 votes on the WFP line, the party gained an automatic ballot line for the succeeding four years.

2000s

2000
Patricia Eddington of the WFP was elected to the New York State Assembly. In the 2002 election, the Liberal Party, running Andrew Cuomo (who had withdrawn from the Democratic primary), and the Green Party, running academic Stanley Aronowitz, failed to reach that threshold and lost the ballot lines they had previously won. This left the WFP as the only left-progressive minor party with a ballot line. This situation continued until 2011 following the party's cross-endorsement of Eliot Spitzer in the 2006 election, in which he received more than 155,000 votes on the Working Families Party line, more than three times the required 50,000.

2003
In the chaotic situation that followed the 2003 assassination of New York City councilman James E. Davis by political rival Othniel Askew, the slain councilman's brother Geoffrey Davis was chosen to succeed him in the Democratic primary in Brooklyn's 35th City Council district. As it became clear that Geoffrey Davis lacked his late brother's political experience, fellow Democrat Letitia James decided to challenge him in the general election on the WFP line. James prevailed, becoming the first third-party candidate elected solely on the WFP line.

2006
In 2006, the party began ballot access drives in California, Delaware, Massachusetts, Oregon, and South Carolina.

In South Carolina, the WFP cross-endorsed Democratic party congressional nominees Randy Maatta (District 1) and Lee Ballenger (District 3). In the SC State House elections, the WFP cross-endorsed Democratic Party candidates Anton Gunn (Kershaw, Richland) and Eugene Platt (Charleston).

In New York, the WFP cross-endorsed the statewide Democratic Party slate.

2007
The WFP elected two party members to the city council of Hartford, Connecticut.

2008
The South Carolina Working Families Party convention endorsed five candidates for state and local office. One candidate, Eugene Platt, running for SC State House District 115, was also nominated by the South Carolina Green Party. The nomination of Michael Cone for the US Senate race, opposing incumbent Lindsey Graham, marked the first time the South Carolina party nominated anyone for statewide office. Cone was defeated by former Horry County Republican Committee member Bob Conley in the Democratic primary.

The Connecticut WFP helped elect congressman Jim Himes, defeating long-term Republican congressman Chris Shays.

The WFP endorsed Barack Obama for U.S. President on all their state lines.

2009
The WFP endorsed several candidates for local offices, Bill Thompson for New York City mayor, Bill de Blasio for Public Advocate, and Corey Ellis for Albany mayor. Ellis did very well in the Albany mayoral election, 2009, coming in second ahead of the Republican candidate. The WFP also backed eight new members of the city council, including Brad Lander and Jumaane Williams, who helped create the New York City Council Progressive Caucus.

Two candidates for the Board of Education in Bridgeport, Connecticut were also WFP-supported and are now members of the board.

2010s

2010
Andrew Cuomo, the Democratic nominee for Governor of New York, accepted the Working Families Party cross-endorsement.

In the same year, the Connecticut WFP endorsed Dannel Malloy for governor. He received 26,308 votes as a Working Families candidate, putting him ahead of his Republican opponent, and securing ballot access for the party in that state.

2011
In Connecticut, the WFP won all three minority seats on the city council of Hartford, completely eliminating Republican representation. As of 2016, the WFP continues to hold all minority seats on the Hartford City Council.

2012
In Connecticut, the WFP backed Chris Murphy's successful race against billionaire Linda McMahon for the US Senate seat that was vacated by Joe Lieberman, supported SEIU/CCAG leader and organizer Christopher Donovan for Connecticut's 5th Congressional seat, as well as defeated a ballot initiative in Bridgeport, Connecticut that would have abolished the elected board of education.
In Oregon, the WFP backed Jeff Reardon for state house, a challenger who defeated Democrat Mike Schaufler in the primary. The party opposed Schaufler's conservative record on taxes, healthcare and the environment.

2013
In November 2013, the Party endorsed the successful New York City candidates Bill de Blasio for Mayor, Letitia James for Public Advocate, and Scott Stringer for Comptroller, as well as a dozen WFP-backed candidates to the City Council, dramatically growing the Progressive Caucus. The Working Families ballot line contributed 42,640 votes to de Blasio's total of 795,679 votes, and 53,821 to James's total of 814,879 votes.

2014
After considering Zephyr Teachout, the party re-endorsed Cuomo for New York Governor despite some dissatisfaction and frustration with his first term. However, Cuomo resisted the party's influence and sabotaged the party electorally. In 2010 more than 150,000 of his votes came on the WFP line. As of November 7, 2014, 120,425 votes came on the WFP line for Cuomo, less than in 2010 likely due to "dissatisfaction and frustration" dropping the party from fourth to fifth, behind the Conservative Party and the Green Party.

2015
Edwin Gomes, running in a February 2015 special election for the Connecticut State Senate, became the first candidate in the nation to win a state legislative office running solely as a nominee for the Working Families Party.

On May 5, 2015, Diana Richardson won a special election for a seat in the New York State Assembly, running only on the Working Families ticket.

NY WFP ran 111 candidates in 2015, winning 71 local offices.

In December 2015, the WFP endorsed Bernie Sanders in his 2016 campaign for U.S. president; this was the WFP's first national endorsement. In 2016, after Hillary Clinton became the Democratic nominee, the WFP endorsed her for president.

2016
In the fall of 2015, the Working Families Party conducted a combined membership-drive and open poll among its enrolled members on whom to endorse for President in 2016; the result being Bernie Sanders. Official numbers were not disclosed but party spokesman and co-founder Dan Cantor said the results were "overwhelmingly" in favor of Sanders, with some sources stating it was an 87 to 12 to 1 percent vote with Sanders over Hillary Clinton and Martin O'Malley respectively.  The South Carolina Working Families Party cross- endorsed Democratic nominee Dimitri Cherry in his effort to unseat incumbent Congressman Mark Sanford in South Carolina's 1st Congressional District; Cherry also garnered the endorsement of South Carolina's Green Party but lost to Sanford in the general election.

2017
In 2017, Joshua M. Hall, running in an April 2017 special election for the Connecticut House of Representatives, became the second candidate in the nation to win a state legislative office running solely as a nominee for the Working Families Party.

On October 3, 2017, a runoff election for Mayor of Birmingham, Alabama, resulted in the election of Randall Woodfin, who had been backed by the Working Families Party.

2018
In April 2018 an endorsement of Cynthia Nixon over incumbent Andrew Cuomo in Cuomo's bid for a third term as New York governor caused a schism in the party in which labor unions including New York's biggest union Service Employees International Union and Communications Workers of America to indicate they would not support the party in the election. The withdrawal was believed would significantly hurt the party's finances which in 2018 was $1.7 million and statewide staff of about 15 people. The battle received considerable attention since there were concerns that Nixon might have drained enough votes from Cuomo in the general election to allow a Republican to be elected.

In the race for New York's 14th congressional district, Joe Crowley remained on the ballot as the Working Families Party candidate even though the party withdrew support from him after his loss in the Democratic primary to Alexandria Ocasio-Cortez.

In September 2018, Alessandra Biaggi was endorsed in her bid for New York State Senate.

On October 5, 2018, the Working Families Party cleared Cynthia Nixon from their ticket on the general election ballot and agreed to endorse Cuomo, who defeated Nixon in the Democratic primary, for a third term.

2019
On September 16, 2019, the Working Families Party endorsed Elizabeth Warren in the 2020 Democratic Party presidential primaries. In the 2016 primaries the party endorsed Bernie Sanders, one of Warren's opponents in the 2020 primary. Some backlash ensued after that decision was made due to the refusal of the WFP to release the vote; they had previously released the vote in 2016. Jacobin speculated that Sanders had likely won the party's membership vote, which mathematically implied that Warren received 82% to 100% of the leadership vote and only received between 22% and 40% of member support.

On November 5, 2019, the Working Families Party candidate Kendra Brooks won an At-Large seat on Philadelphia City Council. The City Council reserves two seats for a minority party, and this is the first time one of those seats went to a candidate not on the Democrat or Republican line in forty years.

2020s

2020

On March 9, 2020, after Elizabeth Warren dropped out of the 2020 Democratic Party presidential primaries, the Working Families Party endorsed Bernie Sanders for president. They endorsed Joe Biden on August 13, 2020, during the run-up to the 2020 Democratic National Convention.

2021

The Working Families Party initially gave a ranked endorsement for the 2021 New York City Democratic mayoral primary, members voted to rank Scott Stringer first, Dianne Morales second, and Maya Wiley third. After Stringer was accused of sexual assault, they rescinded his endorsement and issued a dual endorsement of Morales and Wiley. They then backed Wiley after Morales campaign staff alleged union busting.

2022

The Working Families Party set up a California chapter in January 2022, naming former San Francisco Supervisor and State Director of Bernie Sanders' 2020 presidential campaign Jane Kim as its executive director.

Leadership
Daniel Cantor, a staffer on Jesse Jackson's 1988 presidential campaign, and Joel Rogers, a University of Wisconsin law professor and a Nation magazine editor, launched the party in 1992. "We are not running people for President or senator—at least not yet!—but for city councils, county boards, water commissioner, school boards, the occasional state assembly seat. Only after having established ourselves at this local level will we try to move up the electoral greasy pole."

The state directors of the WFP are Sochie Nnaemeka (NY), Lindsay Farrell (CT), Sue Altman (NJ), Brandon Evans (PA), Karly Edwards (OR), Jay Hutchins (MD), Delvone Michael (DC), Marina Dimitrijevic (WI), Ryan Frankenberry (WV), Georgia Hollister-Isman (RI), and Jane Kim (CA). WFP's national director is Maurice Mitchell.

Reception
Some left-wing commentators have criticized the WFP for being insufficiently committed to progressive principles. The editor of the World Socialist Web Site has called the WFP an "opportunist" party for its close work with the Democrats.

In August 2009, various media raised questions about the relationship between the WFP, a non-profit political party, and a for-profit private company called Data and Field Services (DFS). An editorial in The New York Times questioned whether DFS may be charging select clients below market rates for political services. In August 2010, the federal investigation into the party ended with no charges being filed, and no charges being referred to other law enforcement agencies.

In 2011 Connecticut WFP director Jon Green received a $10,000 fine for failing to wear his badge identifying him as a lobbyist while performing lobbying efforts.

See also
 Union organizer

Notes

References

External links
 
 Working Families Party article in The Daily Beast

 
Political parties established in 1998
Progressive parties in the United States
Social democratic parties in the United States
Social liberal parties in the United States
1998 establishments in New York (state)
Political parties in New York (state)
Political parties in the United States